The following is a list of holiday parades that occur between Thanksgiving Day (in the U.S.) and early January, coinciding with the Christmas and holiday season.

Africa

South Africa
 Cape Town: Kaapse Klopse (Cape Town Minstrel Carnival), held annually on 2 January (Second New Year)

Asia

India
 Kolkata: Kolkata Christmas Festival. Parade held along Park Street in the week prior to Christmas.:)

Japan
 Osaka: Universal Studios Christmas parade. Annual parades staged in the lead up to Christmas, hosted by Universal Studios Japan
 Tokyo: Disney Christmas stories. Annual parade staged by Tokyo Disneyland.

Malaysia
 Miri: Miri Christmas Parade. Held annually since 2008.

Philippines
 Bay City, Metro Manila: The Grand Festival of Lights Parade. Annual Christmas parade staged by SM Mall of Asia, on each Saturday evening leading up to Christmas. 
 San Fernando: Giant Lantern Parade. Part of the annual Giant Lantern Festival.

South Korea
 Yongin: Everland Christmas Fantasy. Various daily Christmas themed parades held at the Everland theme park, annually in November and December.

Thailand
 Sakon Nakhon: Christmas Star Procession. Held annually since 1982.

Europe

Belgium
 Brussels and other Belgian cities: La Parade de Noël RTL. Annual Christmas parades held in Belgium, sponsored by television RTL-TVI and radio Bel RTL.

Finland

 Helsinki: Helsinki Christmas Parade. Held annually in late November since 1949, as part of the Opening of the Aleksanterinkatu Christmas Street festivities.

France
 Hautmont: La Parade Lumineuse magique (The Magic Luminous Parade). Held annually in December as part of the Hautmont Capitale de Noël (capital of Christmas) festivities.
 Paris: Disneyland Paris Christmas Parade

Germany
 Hamburg: Hamburger Weihnachtsparade (Hamburg Christmas parade). Held annually on all four Advent Saturdays.

Ireland
 Dingle, County Kerry: Wren's Day parades, held on 26 December, St. Stephen's Day. (Article)

Netherlands
Valkenburg: Valkenburg Christmas Parade

Spain
 Alcoy: Cabalgata de Reyes Magos de Alcoy (Cavalcade of Magi of Alcoy), held on the night of January 5 (night of the Three Wise Men), since the mid 19th century. (Article)
 Barcelona: Three Kings’ Parade (a Cavalcada de Reis Mags d'Orient), held 5 January, attracting crowds up to 500,000. (Article)
 Madrid: La Cabalgata de los Reyes Magos de Madrid (The Cavalcade of the Magi from Madrid). (Spanish site)

Sweden
 Stockholm: Sankta Lucia procession, held annually on 13 December since 1927.

United Kingdom

England
 Birmingham: Birmingham Christmas Parade
 Buckingham: Buckingham Christmas Parade. Held annually since 1984
 London: Hamleys Christmas Toy Parade
 London: London's New Year's Day Parade
 Penzance: Montol Festival. Procession held annually on 21 December
 Windsor: Reindeer Parade

Scotland
 Edinburgh: Torchlight Procession. Held annually on the evening of December 30, as the opening event of Edinburgh's Hogmanay festival.

Oceania

Australia

New South Wales
 Gerringong: Gerringong Christmas Street Parade (Article)
 Gosford: Gosford City Christmas Parade. Held annually since the 1950s.
 Sydney: Sydney Christmas Parade

Queensland
 Brisbane: Myer Christmas Parade and Pantomime (Article)
 Bundaberg: Pageant of Lights. Held annually in early December.
 Cooroy: Christmas in Cooroy. A two-day annual event, with the street parade held on the first Saturday in December
 Gold Coast: White Christmas (Warner Bros. Movie World)
 Ipswich: Christmas Parade of Lights (Article)
 Mooloolaba: Mooloolaba Christmas Boat Parade
 Rockhampton: Rockhampton Christmas Parade (Article)

South Australia
 Adelaide: Adelaide Christmas Pageant. Established in 1933, the event is staged on the second Saturday of November and draws crowds reaching 500,000.
 Glenelg: Glenelg Christmas Pageant. Held annually since 1954
 Mount Gambier: Mount Gambier Christmas Parade. First held in 1959, the event is always staged on the third Saturday of November. / History Article)
 Norwood: Norwood Christmas Pageant
 Port Adelaide: Twilight Christmas Parade
 Salisbury: Salisbury City Centre Christmas Parade
 Tanunda: Barossa Christmas Parade (Article)
 Whyalla: Whyalla Christmas Pageant

Tasmania
 Burnie: Burnie Christmas Parade
 George Town: George Town Annual Christmas Parade
 Hobart: Myer Hobart Christmas Pageant. Held on the third Saturday of November each year.
 Launceston: Apex Launceston Christmas Parade. Held on the first Saturday in December.
 Wynyard: Wynyard Christmas Parade (Article)

Victoria
 Geelong: Gala Day Parade. First held in 1916, to raise money for the Red Cross Society at the height of World War I.
 Melbourne: Myer Christmas Parade

Western Australia
 Albany: City of Albany Christmas Festival and Pageant
 Bunbury: City of Bunbury Christmas Carnival and Parade (Article)
 Mandurah: Mandurah Community Christmas Pageant
 Perth: Perth Christmas Pageant (Article)

New Zealand
 Auckland: Farmers Santa Parade (4th Sunday of November)
 Christchurch: Christchurch Children's Christmas Parade Trust (1st Sunday of December)
 Dunedin: Dunedin Santa Parade (2nd Sunday of December)
 Hamilton: Hamilton Christmas Parade (2nd Sunday of December)
 Palmerston North: Palmerston North Christmas Parade (2nd Sunday of December)
 Rotorua: Rotorua Christmas Parade (1st Saturday of December)
 Wellington: A Very Welly Christmas

North America

Bahamas
 Nassau: Boxing Day Junkanoo Parade. Part of the Bahamian national festival of Junkanoo

Canada

Alberta
 Edmonton: Santa's Parade of Lights.

British Columbia
 Maple Ridge: Christmas in the Park and the Santa Claus Parade
 Nanaimo: Nanaimo's Santa Claus Parade
 Surrey: Big Rig for Kids Lighted Truck Parade
 Surrey: Surrey Santa Parade of Lights
 Vancouver: Rogers' Santa Claus Parade
 Victoria: Island Farms Santa's Light Parade
 Victoria: Truck Light Convoy and Food Drive

Manitoba
 Winnipeg: Winnipeg Santa Parade

New Brunswick
 Quispamsis and Rothesay: Kennebecasis Valley Santa Claus Parade
 Moncton, Riverview, and Dieppe: Greater Moncton Santa Claus Parade
St Andrews:  Saturday Dec 6
Fredericton: Saturday Nov 29
Caraquet:    Saturday Nov 15
Sussex:      Saturday Dec 6
Bathurst:    Sunday Dec 7

Newfoundland and Labrador
 St. John's: Downtown Christmas Parade.

Nova Scotia
 Christmas Parade of Lights- Halifax, Nova Scotia
 Halifax Christmas Parades- Halifax, Nova Scotia

Ontario

 Acton: Acton Firefighters Santa Claus Parade
 Ajax: Santa Claus Parade
 Beeton: Santa Claus Parade, route from Jackson Plaza to the Fairgrounds. (Article)
 Bowmanville: Santa Claus Parade
 Brampton: Brampton Santa Claus Parade organized by the Brampton Board of Trade, Santa's Parade at Shoppers World Brampton
 Brantford: JCI Brantford Santa Claus Parade
 Brighton: Santa Claus Parade
 Brockville: Brockville Santa Claus Parade
 Bolton (part of Caledon): Christmas Parade, organized by the Kinsmen Club
 Carleton Place: Carleton Place Santa Claus Parade
 Deseronto: Santa Claus Parade
 Elora: Santa Claus Parade
 Fergus: Fergus Santa Claus Parade
 Frankford: Santa Claus Parade
 Georgetown: Annual Santa Claus Parade
 Goderich: Santa Claus Parade, Article
 Guelph: Guelph Community Santa Claus Parade
 Grimsby: Grimsby Santa Claus Parade
 Hespeler (Cambridge): Hespeler Santa Claus Parade (Article)
 Markham: Markham Santa Claus Parade
 Mattawa: The Mattawa Santa Claus Parade
 Milton: Milton Santa Claus Parade, Heritage Parade of Lights at Country Heritage Park
 Mississauga (Streetsville): Mississauga Santa Claus Parade
 Newcastle: Newcastle Santa Parade
 North Bay: North Bay Santa Claus Parade
 Oakville: Oakville Santa Claus Parade
 Orillia: Orillia Santa Claus Parade
 Oshawa: Santa's Parade of Lights
 Ottawa: Help Santa Toy Parade
 Ottawa (Barrhaven): Barrhaven Lions Light Up The Night Parade
 Ottawa (Kanata): Kanata Hazeldean Mall Santa Claus Parade
 Ottawa (Orleans): Sanata's Parade of Lights
 Pickering: Annual Kinsmen & Kinette Club Santa Claus Parade (Press release)
 Port Hope: Port Hope Santa Claus Parade
 Port Perry: Port Perry Santa Claus Parade
 Puslinch: Puslinch Santa Claus Parade
 Rockwood: Rockwood's Farmers' Santa Claus Parade of Lights
 Sault Ste. Marie: Rotary Santa Claus Parade
 Smith Falls: Smith Falls Santa Claus Parade
 Stratford: Santa's Parade of Lights
 Sturgeon Falls: The Sturgeon Falls Parade of Lights
 Timmins: Timmins Santa Claus Parade (Article)
 Toronto: Toronto Santa Claus Parade, Independent organization, formally Eaton's 
 Toronto (Etobicoke): Etobicoke Lakeshore Christmas Parade
 Toronto (Weston): Weston Village Santa Claus Parade
 Toronto (The Beaches): Hamper's Santa Claus Parade
 Trenton: Trenton Santa Claus Parade
 Uxbridge: Uxbridge Santa Claus Parade
 Vaughan: Vaughan Santa Claus Parade (SantaFest)
 Watford: Santa Claus Parade
 Whitby: JCI Whitby Santa Claus

Quebec
 Gatineau: Gatineau Santa Claus Parade
 Montreal: Montreal Santa Claus Parade

Saskatchewan
 Saskatoon: Saskatoon Santa Claus Parade. Originated in 1990.

Yukon
 Whitehorse: Winterval Santa Parade (Article)

Mexico
 Irapuato, Guanajuato: Three Kings Parade (Cabalgata de Reyes Magos)
 Oaxaca City: Las Calendas Christmas processions. Held on the night of December 24, concluding the Las Posadas celebrations.
 Querétaro City: Desfile de Carro Biblicos (Biblical Float Parade). Held each year on Christmas Eve since 1828. (Article – Spanish)

United States

Alabama
 Montgomery: Hornet Homecoming Parade (held by Alabama State University)
Opelika: Small scale community parade in Downtown Opelika with different schools, pageants, churches, businesses and community service operations. Held on the first Wednesday of November. Associated with "Christmas in a Railroad Town" also in Downtown Opelika.

Arizona

 Apache Junction: Holiday Program and Light Parade
 Beaver Dam: Beaver Dam Christmas Parade
 Benson: Benson Christmas Parade
 Buckeye: Glow on Monroe Electric Light Parade
 Camp Verde: Christmas Bazaar and Parade of Lights
 Carefree: Carefree Christmas Festival and Electric Light Parade
 Casa Grande: Electric Light Parade
 Chandler: Parade of Lights
 Clifton: Clifton Light Parade
 Coolidge: Christmas Light Parade
 Cottonwood: Annual Cottonwood Christmas Parade
 Duncan: Duncan Small Town Christmas Parade
 Eagar: Round Valley Christmas Light Parade
 Flagstaff: Northern Lights Holiday Parade
 Fountain Hills: Thanksgiving Day Parade aka Parada de los Cerros
 Florence: Christmas on Main Street and Holiday Light Parade
 Gila Bend: All A Glow Christmas Light Parade
 Glendale: Hometown Christmas Parade
 Globe: Christmas Light Parade
 Holbrook: Christmas Festival of Lights and Parade
 Kingman: Parade of Lights
 Lake Havasu City: Boat Parade of Lights
 Litchfield Park: Christmas in the Park Festival and Parade
 Nogales: The Light of Christmas Parade
 Page: Lake Powell Christmas Parade
 Payson: Electric Light Parade
 Peoria, Arizona: Annual Santa Claus Parade
 Phoenix: APS Electric Light Parade
 Phoenix: Fiesta Bowl Parade
 Prescott: Prescott Chamber Christmas Parade
 Prescott Valley: Holiday Festival of Lights & Parade
 Quartzsite: Quartzsite Christmas Light Parade
 Queen Creek: Queen Creek Holiday Festival and Parade
 Safford: Holiday Light Parade
 Sahuarita: Winter Festival and Holiday Light Parade
 San Luis: Holiday of Lights Parade
 Show Low: Show Low Shines Christmas Parade
 Sierra Vista: Christmas Light Parade
 Somerton: Somerton Light Parade
 Springerville: Round Valley Christmas Light Parad
 Tempe: Festival of Lights Boat Parade
 Tempe: Festival of Lights Opening Night Parade
 Tolleson: Luces de Navidad aka Lights of Christmas Parade
 Tombstone: Christmas Light Parade
 Tuba City: Tuba City Christmas Light Parade
 Tucson: Parade of Lights
 Wickenburg: Annual Christmas Parade of Lights
 Willcox: Christmas Lighted Parade
 Williams: Parade of Lights
 Winslow: Annual Christmas Parade
 Yuma: Dorothy Young Memorial Electric Light Parade
 Yuma: Foothills Parade of Lights

California
 Adelanto: Adelanto Christmas Parade
 Alpine: Alpine Christmas Parade of Lights & Snow Festival
 Alturas: Alturas Winter Fest and Parade
 American Canyon: Holiday Tree Lighting & Lighted Parade
 Anaheim: A Christmas Fantasy Parade at Disneyland
 Anderson: Anderson Christmas Parade
 Angels Camp: Lighted Christmas Parade
 Antioch: Antioch Holiday Parade and Tree Lighting
 Antioch: Bridge Marina Lighted Boat Parade
 Arroyo Grande: Arroyo Grande Christmas Parade
 Arvin: Arvin Christmas Parade
 Atwater: Atwater Christmas Parade
 Auburn: Festival of Lights Parade
 Bakersfield: Bakersfield Christmas Parade
 Bass Lake: Christmas Tree Lighting and Parade of Lights
 Beaumont: Annual Christmas Light Parade
 Berkeley: Winter on the Waterfront & Lighted Boat Parade
 Bethel Island: Bethel Island San Joaquin Yacht Club Lighted Boat Parade
 Benicia: Benicia Christmas Parade & Holiday Market
 Benicia: Lighted Boat Parade
 Big Bear Lake: Snow Summit Ski Resort New Year's Eve Torchlight Parade
 Bishop: Bishop's Christmas Parade, Tree Lighting and Street of Lights
 Blythe: Blythe Christmas Parade
 Brentwood: Annual Holiday Parade
 Burlingame: Downtown Holiday Parade
 Calexico: Calexico Christmas Parade
 Calistoga: Calistoga Lighted Tractor Parade
 Camarillo: Camarillo Christmas Parade and Holiday Carnival
 Canyon Lake: Canyon Lake Christmas Boat Parade of Lights
 Carpinteria: Carpinteria Holiday Spirit Parade
 Caruthers: Caruthers Christmas Parade and Winter Fest
 Cathedral City: Snow-Fest Parade
 Chatsworth: Chatsworth Holiday Parade & Festival
 Chico: Chico Parade of Lights
 Chino: Chino Youth Christmas Parade and Fair
 Chino Hills: Chino Hills Boat Parade
 Chula Vista: Chula Vista Starlight Parade
 Clearlake: Clearlake Christmas Parade
 Clovis: Children's Electric Christmas Parade
 Coachella: Holiday Parade
 Colfax: Colfax Winterfest Parade of Lights
 Colton: Annual Christmas Parade & Christmas in the Park
 Colton: Colton & Loma Lina Fire Departments Parade of Lights
 Columbia: Columbia Christmas Equestrian Parade
 Compton: Compton Christmas Parade
 Coronado: Coronado Annual Holiday Parade
 Covina: Covina Christmas Parade and Tree Lighting
 Crescent City: Christmas Parade
 Dana Point: Dana Point Harbor Boat Parade of Lights
 Davis: Children's Candlelight Parade
 Delano: Delano Christmas Parade
 Desert Hot Springs: Sands Annual Christmas Cart Parade
 Discovery Bay: Discovery Bay Parade of Lights
 Discovery Bay: Discovery Bay Yacht Club Lighted Boat Parade
 Discovery Bay: Willow Lake Lighted Boat Parade
 Dorris: Annual Butte Valley Christmas Festival and Parade
 Downey: Downey Christmas Parade
 East Los Angeles: East Los Angeles Christmas Parade
 El Cajon: Mother Goose Parade
 El Centro: El Centro Christmas Parade
 El Segundo: El Segundo Holiday Parade
 Elk Grove: Holiday Parade of Lights
 Emeryville: Holiday Tree Lighting and Community Parade
 Encinitas: Encinitas Holiday Parade
 Escalon: Christmas on Main and Parade of Lights
 Escondido: Escondido Jaycees Christmas Parade
 Eureka: Truckers Christmas Parade
 Exeter: Exeter Christmas Parade
 Exeter: Exeter's New Year's Eve Doo-Dah Parade and Free Fireworks Show
 Fair Oaks: Christmas in the Village and Parade
 Fallbrook: Annual Christmas Parade
 Ferndale: Christmas Lighted Tractor Parade
 Folsom: Folsom Police Department and Folsom Fire Department Santa Sleigh Parade
 Fontana: Fontana Christmas Parade
 Fort Bragg: Fort Bragg's Holiday Lights Parade
 Fort Jones: Fort Jones Christmas Parade
 Fortuna: Electric Lighted Parade & Downtown Open House
 Fremont: Niles Festival of Lights Tree Lighting and Parade
 Fresno: Downtown Fresno Christmas Parade
 Galt: Lighting of the Night Parade
 Garberville: Lighted Parade
 Geyserville: Geyserville Tree Lighting and Tractor Parade
 Gilroy: Gilroy Holiday Parade, Tree Lighting and Doggie Dress-Up
 Glendale: Montrose-Glendale Christmas Parade
 Glendora: Glendora's Hometown Christmas Parade
 Granada Hills: Granada Hills Holiday Parade
 Grass Valley: Annual Donation Day Parade
 Gridley: Gridley Holiday Parade of Lights
 Grover Beach: Annual South County Holiday Parade
 Gualala: Lighted Truck Parade and Arrival of Santa Claus
 Guerneville: Holiday Parade of Lights
 Gustine: Gustine's Downtown Christmas Lighted Parade
 Half Moon Bay: Half Moon Bay Night of Lights Parade
 Hanford: Hanford Christmas Parade
 Hayfork: Hayfork Tree Lighting and Light Parade
 Hemet: Hemet Christmas Parade
 Hesperia: Hesperia Jolly Parade
 Hollister: Annual Lights On Celebration & Parade
 Hollywood/Los Angeles: Hollywood Christmas Parade
 Hughson: Hughson Christmas Festival & Parade
 Huntington Beach: Huntington Beach Light a Light of Love Parade
 Huntington Beach: Huntington Harbour Christmas Boat Parade
 Indio: Indio International Tamale Festival Parade
 Indio: Sun City Shadow Hills Christmas Golf Cart Parade
 Ione: Ione Christmas Parade and Open House
 Kelseyville: Kelseyville Christmas in the Country Parade of Lights
 Kerman: Pageantry of Lights Christmas Parade
 King City: King City Chamber of Commerce Christmas Parade
 Kingsburg: Santa Lucia Celebration and Festival of Lights Parade
 La Jolla: The Annual La Jolla Christmas Parade & Holiday Festival
 La Puente: La Puente Holiday Parade and Tree Lighting Ceremony
 Laguna Niguel: Laguna Niguel Holiday Parade 
 Lake Perris: Lights on the Lake Holiday Boat Parade 
 Lakeport: Lakeport Christmas Parade 
 Lancaster: Lancaster Holiday Parade 
 Lathrop: Lathrop Christmas Parade
 Lemoore: Lemoore Christmas Parade
 Lindcoln: Lincoln Hometown Christmas Parade & Tree Lighting
 Lindsay: Lindsay Parade of Lights
 Livermore: Annual Holiday Sights & Sounds Parade and Tree Lighting
 Livingston: Lighted Christmas Parade and Gift Fair
 Lodi: Lodi Parade of Lights
 Loma Linda: Colton & Loma Lina Fire Departments Parade of Lights
 Lompoc: Lompoc Children's Christmas Season Parade
 Lone Pine: Lone Pine Christmas Parade 
 London: London Christmas Parade 
 Long Beach: Belmont Shore Christmas Parade 
 Long Beach: Long Beach Christmas Boat Parade of 1,000 Lights
 Long Beach: Naples Island Annual Holiday Boat Parade 
 Loomis: Loomis Day Before Thanksgiving Parade 
 Los Altos: Los Altos Festival of Lights Parade
 Los Angeles: East Los Angeles Christmas Parade
 Los Angeles: Holiday Parade of Boats
 Los Banos: Downtown Christmas Parade
 Los Gatos: Annual Los Gatos Children's Christmas & Holidays Parade of Boats
 Los Osos: Annual Christmas Parade
 Madera: Madera Candlelight Christmas Parade
 Malibu: Annual Malibu Christmas Woodie Parade at Malibu Village
 Mammoth Lakes: Mammoth Mountain New Year's Eve Torchlight Parade
 Manteca: Manteca Holiday Parade
 Mariposa: Merry Mountain Christmas Parade
 Marina del rey: Marina Del Rey Snow Wonder and Holiday Boat Parade
 Martinez: Holiday Light Parade
 Marysville: Marysville Christmas Parade
 Mecca: Desfile de Luces
 Merced: Merced Christmas Parade
 Mission Viejo/Lake Mission Viejo: Lake Mission Viejo Boat Parade
 Modesto: Celebration of Lights Parade
 Monrovia: Monrovia Tree Lighting Ceremony & Holiday Parade
 Monterey: Annual Parade of Lights
 Monterey: Harbor Lighted Boat Parade
 Montrose: Montrose-Glendale Christmas Parade
 Morro Bay: Caroling Cop Cars and Christmas Trolley Parade
 Morro Bay: Morro Bay Christmas Boat Parade
 Mount Shasta: Winter Magic Festival & Holiday Hometown Light Parade
 Mountain View: Menorah Parade
 Murphys: Murphys Open House Parade
 Murrieta: Holiday Magic Parade
 Newport Beach: Newport Beach Christmas Boat Parade & Ring of Lights
 Needles: Needles Holiday Fun Fair Lighted Christmas Parade
 Napa: Napa's Christmas Parade
 Norco: Annual Horsetown Parade of Lights
 North Fork: North Fork Christmas Parade
 Oakland: Comcast Oakland Holiday Parade – America's Children's Parade 
 Oakland: Oakland Lighted Yacht Parade
 Ocean Beach: Ocean Beach Holiday Parade
 Oceanside: Oceanside Parade of Lights Boat Parade
 Oildale: North of the River Christmas Parade
 Ontario: Christmas on Euclid Menorah Parade
 Orcutt: Old Town Orcutt Christmas Parade
 Oroville: Oroville Parade of Lights
 Oxnard: Oxnard Boat Parade of Lights
 Oxnard: Oxnard Christmas Parade
 Pacific Grove: Annual Parade of Lights
 Pacoima: Pacoima Christmas Parade
 Palm Springs: Palm Springs Festival of Lights Parade
 Palmdale: Palmdale Christmas Parade
 Palo Alto: Menorah Parade
 Paradise: Christmas Lighted Truck Parade
 Parlier: Parlier Christmas Tree Lighting and Parade
 Pasadena: Pasadena Doo Dah Parade
 Pasadena: Rose Parade
 Paso Robles: Annual Christmas Light Parade
 Penngrove: Holiday Parade of Light
 Perris: Perris Christmas Parade
 Petaluma: Petaluma Holiday Lighted Boat Parade
 Pittsburg: Pittsburg Christmas Parade
 Placerville: Placerville Hangtown Christmas Parade
 Pleasanton: Chanukah Parade & Menorah Lighting
 Pleasanton: Hometown Holiday Parade
 Pomona: Pomona Christmas Parade
 Porterville: Children's Christmas Parade
 Quincy: Main Street Sparkle Reindog Parade and Light Parade
 Rancho Cordova: Rancho Cordova Holiday Light Parade
 Rancho Cucamonga: The Ho Ho Parade in Ranch Cucamonga
 Red Bluff: Red Bluff Christmas Parade
 Redding: Redding Lighted Christmas Parade
 Reddlands: Redlands Christmas Parade
 Redondo Beach: King Harbor Yacht Club's Annual Holiday Boat Parade
 Redondo Beach: Riviera Village Holiday Stroll Parade
 Redondo Beach: Santa Float Parade
 Redwood City: Hometown Holidays Parade
 Reedley: Reedley Electrical Farm Equipment Christmas Parade
 Rialto: Rialto Holiday Parade and Vendor Fair
 Ridgecrest: Ridgecrest Children's Christmas Parade
 Rio Linda: Rio Linda Elverta Christmas Light Parade
 Riverbank: Riverbank Christmas Festival & Parade
 Ripon: Ripon Christmas Parade
 Rolling Hills Estates: Annual Palos Verdes Peninsula Holiday Parade
 Roseville: Annual Sylvia Besana Holiday Parade
 Sacramento: Capital City Yacht Club's Lighted Boat Parade
 Sacramento: Sacramento Santa Parade
 Salinas: Salinas Holiday Parade of Lights
 San Bernardino: Annual Community Ho Ho Parade
 San Bernardino: Winter Wonderland and Christmas Parade
 San Diego: Gaslamp Holiday Pet Parade
 San Diego: Mission Bay Christmas Boat Parade
 San Diego: North Park Toyland Parade and Festival
 San Diego: Port of San Diego Holiday Bowl Parade
 San Diego: Ocean Beach Holiday Parade
 San Diego: San Diego Bay Parade of Lights
 San Francisco: Fisherman's Wharf Holiday Lights & Sights Boat Parade
 San Francisco: Parol Lantern Festival and Parade
 San Juan Bautista: San Juan Bautista Holiday of Lights Celebration & Parade
 San Jose: San Jose Holiday Parade
 San Luis Obispo: San Luis Obispo Holiday Parade
 San Marcos: Kiwanis San Marcos Holiday Parade
 San Pedro: San Pedro Holiday Parade
 Rafael: San Rafael Lighted Boat Parade
 Rafael: San Rafael Parade of Lights and Winter Wonderland
 Sanger: Annual Nation's Christmas Tree City Toyland Parade
 Santa Barbara: Downtown Holiday Parade
 Santa Barbara: Santa Barbara Parade of Lights
 Santa Cruz: Santa Cruz Holiday Parade
 Santa Cruz: Santa Cruz Yacht Club Harbor Boat Parade
 Santa Maria: Santa Maria Parade of Lights
 Sausalito: Sausalito Lighted Boat Parade & Fireworks
 Seal Beach: Seal Beach Christmas Parade
 Solvang: Solvang Julefest Parade
 Sonora: Annual Downtown Sonora Christmas Parade
 South Gate: South Gate Christmas Parade
 Squaw Valley: Squaw Valley New Year's Eve Torchlight Parade
 Stockton: Lynn Hahn Memorial Delta Reflections Lighted Boat Parade
 Suisun City: Christmas at the Waterfront Lighted Boat Parade
 Sunnyvale: Lakewood Village Holiday Parade
 Susanville: Annual Magical Country Christmas Celebration & Parade
 Sutter Creek: Sutter Creek Parade of Lights
 Taft: Annual Taft Christmas Parade
 Tahoe City: Granlibakken's Annual Torchlight Parade
 Tehachapi: Tehachapi Christmas Parade & Tree Lighting
 Temecula: Santa's Electric Light Parade
 Temple City: Lights on Temple City Parade and Tree Lighting
 Tracy: Downtown Tracy Holiday Parade & Tree Lighting
 Tulare: Tulare Children's Christmas Parade
 Turlock: Turlock Christmas Parade
 Twain Harte: Winter Wonderland Parade
 Ukiah: Ukiah Parade of Lights
 Upland: Annual Upland Christmas Parade & Holiday Faire
 Upper Lake: Upper Lake Holiday Parade
 Vacaville: Menorah on Main – Menorah Lighting & Community Chanukah Celebration & Parade
 Vallejo: Vallejo Lighted Boat Parade
 Vallejo: Mad Hatter Holiday Festival and Parade
 Valley Springs: Valley Springs Christmas Parade
 Venice: Venice Christmas Boat Parade
 Ventura: Ventura Harbor Parade of Lights
 Victorville: Victorville Christmas Parade
 Villa Park: Villa Park Dry Land Boat Parade
 Visalia: Visalia Annual Candy Cane Lane Parade
 Vista: Visata Christmas Parade
 Walnut Creek: Broadway Plaza's Annual Holiday Parade of Lights, Retailer Open House & Tree Lighting
 Weed: Olde Fashioned Christmas Parade and Tree Lighting Ceremony
 Westwood: Christmas in the Mountains Light Parade
 White Pines: White Pines Parade of Lights
 Whittier: Uptown Christmas Parade
 Wilmington: Heart of the Harbor Holiday Parade
 Winters: Tractor Parade & Tree Lighting
 Woodlake: Woodlake Christmas Parade
 Woodland: Woodlake Holiday Parade
 Wrightwood: Mountain High Resort New Year's Eve Torchlight Parade
 Yreka: Candy Cane Stripes and Christmas Lights Holiday Parade
 Yuba City: Yuba City Holiday Parade

Connecticut
 Stamford, Connecticut: UBS Parade Spectacular (held the Sunday before Thanksgiving to not directly compete with the Macy's Thanksgiving Day Parade 30 miles away)

Colorado
 Mt. Crested Butte: Annual Crested Butte Mountain Resort Torchlight Parade

Delaware
 Seaford, Delaware:  Parade Spectacular Event. It is held the first Saturday of December.

Florida
 Alachua: Alachua Annual Christmas Parade
 Altha: Alatha Christmas Parade & Celebration
 Amelia Island: Lighted Christmas Parade
 Apollo Beach: Apollo Beach Christmas Golf Cart Parade
 Apollo Beach: Apollo Beach Lighted Boat Parade
 Apopka: Apopka Christmas Parade
 Astor: Annual Lighted Parade of Boats (Santa's Workshop)
 Auburndale: Havendale Christmas Parade
 Avon Park: Avon Park Christmas Parade
 Barefoot Bay: Bayfoot Bay Christmas Parade
 Bartow: Christmas Golf Cart Parade
 Bartow: Downtown Bartow Christmas Parade
 Belleview: Belleview Christmas Parade
 Beverly Hills: Christmas in the Hills Parade
 Boca Raton: Boca Raton Boat Parade
 Bonita Springs: Bonita Springs Christmas Boat Parade
 Bowling Green: Bowling Green Christmas Parade
 Boynton Beach: Boynton/Delray Holiday Boat Parade
 Bradenton: Annual Christmas Golf Cart Parade
 Bradenton: Christmas on the Braden River
 Callahan: Callahan Christmas Parade
 Cape Coral: Cape Coral Christmas Boat Parade
 Captiva Island: Captiva Holiday Village Golf Cart Parade
 Carabelle: Holiday on the Harbor Boat Parade of Lights
 Casselberry: Lake Howell Boat Parade
 Cedar Key: Cedar Key Christmas Boat Parade aka A Cedar Key Christmas
 Chipley: Chipley Christmas Fest Parade
 Christmas: Wedgefield HOA Christmas Golf Cart Parade
 Citrus Springs: Citrus Springs Christmas Parade
 Clearwater: Clearwater Holiday Lighted Boat Parade
 Clearwater: Island Estates Yacht Club Boat Parade
 Clermont: Johns Lake Boat Parade
 Cocoa Beach: Cocoa Beach Christmas Boat Parade
 Coral Gables: Junior Orange Bowl Parade
 Crestview: Crestview Christmas Parade
 Crystal River: Crystal River Christmas Parade
 Crystal River: Crystal River Community Holiday Boat Parade
 Dade City: Annual Magical Night Christmas Parade
 Davenport: Davenport Winterfest and Parade
 Daytona Beach: Daytona Beach Christmas Boat Parade
 Daytona Beach Shores: Shores Christmas Parade
 DeBary: DeBary Christmas Parade
 DeFuniak Springs: DeFuniak Springs Christmas Parade
 DeLand: DeLand Christmas Boat Parade
 DeLand: Downtown DeLand Christmas Parade
 Deltona: Deltona Christmas Parade
 Destin: Destin Christmas Parade
 Destin: Holiday on the Harbor Destin Lighted Boat Parade
 Dundee: Dundee Christmas Parade
 Dunedin: Dunedin Holiday Boat Parade
 Eastpoint: Eastpoint Christmas Celebration & Parade
 Edgewater: Edgewater Christmas Parade
 Fanning Springs: Festival of Lights and Boat Parade
 Fernandina Beach: Lighted Christmas Parade
 Fleming Island: Whitey's Fish Camp Lighted Boat Parade
 Fort Lauderdale: Chanukah Car Menorah Parade
 Fort Lauderdale: Seminole Hard Rock Winterfest Boat Parade
 Fort Meade: Old Fort Meade Christmas Festival and Parade
 Fort Myers: Fort Myers Beach Christmas Boat Parade
 Fort Pierce: Lighted Boat Parade and Paddleboard/Kayak Parade of Lights
 Fort Walton Beach: Fort Walton Beach Christmas Parade
 Freeport: Freeport Christmas Parade
 Gibsonton: Annual Alafia Lighted Boat Parade
 Grand Ridge: Grand Ridge Christmas Parade
 Groveland: Annual Groveland Christmas Parade
 Gulf Breeze: Gulf Breeze Christmas Parade
 Gulfport: Annual Gulfport & Boca Ciega Yacht Club Lighted Christmas Boat Parade
 Haines City: Haines City's Glitter, Glisten & Snow
 Hastings: Hastings Annual Christmas Parade
 Hawthorne: Hawthorne Annual Christmas Parade & Festival
 Hernando Beach: Boat Parade
 High Springs: Annual Twilight Christmas Parade
 Hobe Sound: Hobe Sound Christmas Parade
 Holly Hill: Holly Hill Christmas Parade
 Hollywood: Candy Cane Parade
 Holmes Beach: Privateers Christmas Parade and Santa Open House
 Homosassa: Holiday Boat Parade
 Indian Rocks Beach: Indian Rocks Beach Holiday Lighted Boat Parade
 Indian Rocks Beach: Indian Rocks Beach Holiday Street Parade
 Indian Shores: Redington Beach and Indian Shores Holiday Boat Parade
 Inverness: Citrus County Airboat Alliance Parade
 Inverness: Citrus County Christmas Parade
 Jacksonville: Jacksonville Light Parade
 Jacksonville: Julington Creek Holiday Light Parade aka Holiday on the Creek
 Jasper: Sweets N the Streets Christmas Festival and Parade
 Jay: Jay Christmas Parade
 Jupiter: Jupiter Boat Parade and Celebration
 Jupiter: Jupiter Tequesta Athletic Association Holiday Parade
 Key Colony Beach: Key Colony Beach Christmas Boat Parade
 Key Largo: Key Largo Boat Parade
 Key West: Hometown Holiday Parade
 Key West: Schooner Wharf Bar/Absolut Vodka Lighted Boat Parade
 Keystone Heights: Keystone Heights Christmas Parade
 Kissimmee: Kissimmee Festival of Lights Parade
 Lady Lake: Lady Lake Christmas Parade
 Lake Alfred: Lake Alfred Christmas Parade
 Lake City: Lake City Rotary Christmas Parade
 Lake Wales: Lake Wales Christmas Parade
 Lakeland: Christmas Parade
 Lakeport: Lakeport Christmas Boat Parade
 Lantana: Annual Lake Osborne Holiday Boat Parade
 Leesburg: Leesburg Christmas Parade
 Leesburg: Leesburg's Christmas on the Water aka Toys for Tots Lighted Holiday Boat Parade
 Leesburg: The Villages Christmas Parade
 Little Havana: Parada de los Reyes Mago (Three Kings Parade), held annually since 1971
 Longwood: Longwood Christmas Parade
 Lower Keys: Lower Keys Lighted Boat Parade
 Madeira Beach: Festival of Lights Boat Parade
 Marathon: Boot Key Harbor Lighted Christmas Parade
 Marianna: Main Street Christmas Parade
 Marco Island: Marco Island Christmas Island Style Boat Parade
 Matlacha: Christmas Boat Parade
 Melbourne: Melbourne Light Parade
 Melbourne Beach: Annual Children's Christmas Parade
 Melrose: Merry Melrose Parade and Arts and Crafts Festival
 Merritt Island: Merritt Island Christmas Boat Parade
 Merritt Island: Merritt Island Holiday Parade
 Miami: Miami Outboard Club Holiday Boat Parade
 Mount Dora: Christmas Parade
 Mount Dora: Christmas Lighted Boat Parade
 Milton: Blackwater Pyrates Christmas Boat Parade aka Christmas on the River
 Mulberry: Mulberry's Christmas Parade
 Naples: Naples Christmas Boat Parade on Naples Bay
 Naples: Naples Christmas Parade
 Naples: The Village at Venetian Bay Boat Parade
 New Port Richey: Cotee River Christmas Boat Parade
 New Smyrna Beach: Annual Christmas Parade
 New Smyrna Beach: Annual Holiday Boat Parade
 Newberry: Newberry Christmas Parade
 Niceville: Bluewater Christmas Boat Parade
 Niceville: Boggy Bayou Holiday Boat Parade
 Niceville: Niceville Christmas Parade
 North Fort Myers: North Fort Myers Christmas Parade
 North Miami: North Miami Thanksgiving Parade
 Oak Hill: Oak Hill Christmas Parade
 Ocala: Christmas Golf Cart Parade
 Ocala: Ocala / Marion County Christmas Parade
 Ocoee: Ocoee Christmas Parade
 Okeechobee: Christmas Boat Parade
 Okeechobee: Top of the Lake Christmas Festival and Parade
 Orange City: Christmas Light Up Village and Parade
 Orlando: Chanukah Parade & Celebration
 Orlando: Florida Citrus Parade
 Orlando: Orlando Christmas Parade
 Orlando: Winter Spark in Baldwin Park – Christmas Parade
 Ozona: Christmas Golf Cart Parade
 Palm Bay: Palm Bay Hospital Holiday Light Parade
 Palm Beach: Jupiter Boat Parade and Celebration
 Palm City: Meridian Marina's Martin County Christmas Boat Parade
 Palm Coast: Christmas Boat Parade
 Palm Valley: Palm Valley Boat Parade
 Palmetto: Manatee River Holiday Boat Parade
 Panama City: Panama City Christmas Boat Parade
 Panama City: Panama City Christmas Parade
 Panama City: Pier Park Christmas Parade
 Pensacola: Pensacola Elf Parade
 Pensacola: Lighted Boat Parade
 Pinellas Park: Pinellas Park Christmas Parade
 Placida: Gasparilla Marina Christmas Boat Parade
 Plant City: Plant City Christmas Parade
 Poinciana: Christmas Parade & Celebration
 Pompano Beach: Holiday Boat Parade
 Polk City: Polk City Christmas Parade
 Port Orange: Port Orange Christmas Parade
 Punta Gorda: Charlotte County Chamber of Commerce's Annual Christmas Parade
 Punta Gorda: The Annual Saturday Night Before Christmas Eve Boat Parade
 Redington Beach: Redington Beach and Indian Shores Holiday Boat Parade
 Safety Harbor: Safety Harbor Holiday Parade
 St. Augustine: Holiday Regatta of Lights
 St. Augustine: St. Augustine Annual Christmas Parade
 St. Cloud: St. Cloud Annual Christmas Parade
 St. James City: Pine Island Lighted Christmas Boat Parade
 St. Pete Beach: Pass-a-Grille/Vina Del Mar Parade
 St. Pete Beach: Christmas Market and Parade
 St. Pete Beach: St. Pete Beach & South Pasadena Holiday Lighted Boat Parade
 St. Pete Beach: St. Pete Beach Boat Parade and Winter Festival in the Park
 St. Petersburg: St. Petersburg's Illuminated Boat Parade
 Sanford: Sanford Muddy Waters ATV Assn. Christmas Parade
 Sanford: Sanford's Annual Illuminated Christmas Parade
 Sanford: Sanford's Illuminated Holiday Boat Parade
 Sarasota: Sarasota Holiday Boat Parade of Lights
 Satellite Beach: Grand Canal Holiday Boat Parade
 Sebastian: Sebastian Christmas Parade
 Sebring: Sebring Christmas Parade
 South Pasadena: St. Pete Beach & South Pasadena Holiday Lighted Boat Parade
 Spring Hill: Weeki Wachee River Lighted Boat Parade
 Steinhatchee: Boat Parade
 Stuart: Stuart Christmas Boat Parade
 Stuart: Stuart Christmas Parade
 Tallahassee: Tallahassee Winter Festival & Parade
 Tampa: Hillsborough River Holiday Boat Parade
 Tampa: Outback Bowl New Year's Eve Parade
 Tampa: SantaFest & Christmas Parade
 Tarpon Springs: Annual Tarpon Springs Boat Parade
 Tarpon Springs: Tarpon Springs Christmas Parade
 Titusville: Mims Christmas Parade
 Titusville: Titusville Holiday Boat Parade
 Treasure Island: Treasure Island's Lighted Boat Parade
 Umatilla: Cracker Christmas Parade and Festival
 Venice: Venice Christmas Boat Parade
 Venice: Venice Holiday Parade
 Vero Beach: Christmas Boat Parade
 Vero Beach: Vero Beach Christmas Parade
 Walt Disney World (Magic Kingdom): Disney Parks Christmas Day Parade, previously the "Walt Disney World Very Merry Christmas Parade" and the "Walt Disney World Christmas Day Parade"
 Wauchula: Christmas Parade
 Webster: Webster Christmas Parade
 Welaka: Welaka Christmas Boat Parade
 Wellington: Wellington Holiday Parade
 Williston: Light Up Williston Christmas Parade
 Windermere: Windermere Christmas Golf Cart Parade
 Winter Garden: Johns Lake Boat Parade
 Winter Garden: Winter Garden Christmas Golf Cart Parade
 Winter Haven: Havendale Christmas Parade
 Winter Haven: Light Up The Lakes Christmas Boat Parade
 Winter Park: Winter Park Boat Parade and Festival of Lights
 Winter Park: Winter Park Christmas Parade
 Winter Springs: Winter Wonderland Holiday Parade
 Zephyrhills: Main Street Zephyrhills Festival of Lights Christmas Parade

Georgia
 Atlanta: Peach Bowl Parade around New Year's Day
 Atlanta: Children's Christmas Parade, first Saturday in December (second after Thanksgiving)
 Bainbridge: Boat Parade of Lights
 Bainbridge: Bainbridge Christmas Parade
 Rome: Rome Christmas Parade
 Valdosta: Valdosta Christmas Parade

Hawaii
 Waikiki: Waikiki Holiday Parade

Illinois
 Bradley: Bradley Christmas Fantasy Parade
 Chicago: State Street Thanksgiving Day Parade/McDonald's Thanksgiving Parade
 Chicago: Magnificent Mile Lights Festival Tree-Lighting Parade
 Granite City, Illinois Santa's Holiday Ave. Parade Every year on the Saturday before Thanksgiving.
 Havana: Christmas Parade
 O'Fallon: Illuminated Christmas Parade
 Peoria: Santa Claus Parade
 St. Charles: St. Charles Holiday Homecoming and Electric Christmas Parade
 Streator: Annual Santa Claus Parade

Indiana
 Noblesville: Christmas parade

Iowa
 Anamosa: Festival of Lights Parade
 Atlantic: Christmas in Atlantic Lighted Parade
 Belle Plaine: Belle Plaine Old Fashioned Lighted Christmas Parade
 Belmond: Parade of Lights
 Boone: Holiday Lighted Parade
 Burlington: Burlington Lighted Holiday Parade
 Cantril: Lighted Christmas Parade and Soup Supper
 Cedar Rapids: Holiday DeLight Parade
 Chariton: Dazzle Fest Lighted Parade
 Charles City: Holiday Lighted Parade
 Cherokee: Lighted Christmas Parade
 Clarinda: Clarinda Christmas Parade
 Clear Lake: Christmas by the Lake Lighted Parade
 Corning: Light Up The Night Lighted Parade
 Cresco: Santa Holiday Parade
 Creston: No Place Like Creston for the Holidays Celebration
 Davenport: Quad City Arts Festival of Trees Holiday Parade
 Decorah: Decorah Hometown Holidays Lighted Holiday Parade
 DeWitt: DeWitt's Hometown Christmas Parade
 Ely: Lighted Winterfest Parade
 Estherville: The Chocolate Walk and Parade of Lights
 Fairfield: Fairfield Rotary Christmas Parade
 Forest City: Forest City Christmas Parade
 Fort Madison: Fort Madison Parade of Lights
 Greenfield: Festival of Lights Parade
 Humboldt: Lighted Christmas Parade
 Indianola: Holiday Extravaganza and Parade
 Lake City: Christmas Festival Parade
 Lamoni: Christmas Parade
 Le Mars: Le Mars Lighted Christmas Parade
 Madrid: Christmas Extravaganza & Parade
 Manchester: Window Walk and Static Christmas Parade
 Marshalltown: Holiday Stroll Lighted Parade
 Menlo: Menlo Christmas Parade
 Milo: Milo's Small Town Country Christmas Lighted Parade
 Monona: Lighted Holiday Parade & Festival
 Newton: Jasper County Courthouse Lighting and Lighted Christmas Parade
 Northwood: Christmas in Northwood Lighted Parade
 Ogden: Lighted Christmas Parade
 Osage: Christmas on Market Street Parade
 Oskaloosa: Main Street Lighted Christmas Parade
 Pella: Sinterklaas Arrives in Pella
 Perry: Lighted Christmas Parade
 Sac City: Sac City Christmas Parade
 Sibley: Sibley Christmas Parade
 Sioux City: Downtown Holiday Parade
 Storm Lake: Miracle on Lake Avenue Lighted Holiday Parade
 Swisher: Lighted Christmas Parade
 Tama: Christmas Parade
 Toledo: Christmas Parade
 Traer: Traer Lighted Parade
 Vinton: Vinton Christmas Parade
 Washington: Downtown Lighting Ceremony & Lighted Parade
 Webster City: Lighted Parade
 Williams: Lighted Christmas Parade
 Wilton: Wilton Christmas Parade

Kentucky
 Owensboro: Owensboro-Daviess County Christmas Parade – Where Kentucky Starts Christmas

Louisiana
 New Orleans: Bayou Classic Thanksgiving Day Parade

Maryland

 Hampden, Baltimore: The Mayor's Annual Christmas Parade
 Cambridge: Cambridge-Dorchester County Christmas Parade
 Westminster, Maryland: "Miracle on Main Street Holiday Electric Parade"

Massachusetts

 North Attleborough: The Downtown Associates of North Attleborough (DANA) Annual Santa Claus Parade North Attleborough Santa Parade
 Plymouth: America's Hometown Thanksgiving Parade

Michigan
 Blissfield: Holiday Parade
 Chelsea: Chelsea Hometown Holidays and Light Parade
Coopersville: Annual Nighttime Christmas Parade
 Detroit: America's Thanksgiving Parade
 Garden City: Downtown Garden City Santaland Parade
 Lansing: Silver Bells in the City
 Marlette: Marlette Country Christmas Parade
 Marshall: Annual Holiday Parade
 Midland: Midland Santa Parade
 Mount Clemens: Mount Clemens Santa Parade
 Northville: Holiday Lighted Parade
 Rochester: Rochester Hometown Christmas Parade
 Saline: Saline's Annual Holiday Parade

Minnesota
 Minneapolis: The Minneapolis Holidazzle Parade/Target Holidazzle Parade multiple nights at the Nicollet Mall

Mississippi
Greenwood, Mississippi Roy Martin Delta Band Festival Holiday parade is held each year on the first Friday of December followed by fireworks over the Yazoo River

Missouri
 Kansas City, MO: The Holiday Promenade of Stars Parade 
 St. Louis: Ameren St. Louis Thanksgiving Day Parade
 Jefferson City, MO: The Jefferson City Christmas Parade.

Nevada
 Battle Mountain: Battle Mountain Parade of Lights
 Boulder City: Boulder City Christmas Parade
 Carson City: Carson City Parade of Lights
 Elko: Snowflake Festival & Parade of Lights
 Ely: Ely Christmas Parade
 Fernley: Fernley Christmas Extravaganza and Parade
 Gardnerville: Annual Parade of Lights
 Hawthorne: Annual Parade of Lights
 Henderson: WinterFest Evening Light Parade
 Las Vegas: Downtown Summerlin Holiday Parade
 Las Vegas: Menorah Car Chanukah Parade
 Lovelock: Lovelock Parade of Lights
 Mesquite: Annual Christmas Parade of Lights
 Minden: Annual Parade of Lights
 Reno: Annual Hidden Valley Parade of Lights
 Reno: Mt. Rose Ski Tahoe Falcons New Year's Eve Torchlight Parade
 Sparks: Annual Hometowne Christmas Celebration and Parade
 Virginia City: Christmas on the Comstock Parade
 West Wendover: Light Up The Sky Holiday Parade
 Winnemucca: Christmas Parade of Lights
 Yerington: Yerington Christmas Parade

New Jersey

 Bridgeton: Greater Bridgeton Area Holiday Parade, organized by the Bridgeton Main Street Association
 Burlington: at Burlington Center Mall
 Stone Harbor: Stone Harbor Christmas Parade
 Cherry Hill: at Cherry Hill Mall.
 Jersey City: Santa's Arrival Parade at the Newport Centre Mall. (Article)
 Raritan: John basilone parade
 Voorhees Township: Parade is part of the Tree Lighting Ceremony at Voorhees Town Center.
 Westwood: Westwood Holiday Parade
 Woodbridge: Woodbridge Township Holiday Parade (Press release), Annual Santa Arrival Parade in Woodbridge Center mall

New Mexico
 Albuquerque: Twinkle Light Parade

New York
 Clayton: Clayton Christmas Parade
 Frewsburg: Frewsburg Old Fashioned Santa Parade (held Saturday after Thanksgiving)
 Jamestown: Wide World of Christmas Parade
 New York City: Macy's Thanksgiving Day Parade
 Olean: Santa Claus Lane Parade
 Watertown: Holiday Parade

North Carolina
 Charlotte: Novant Health Thanksgiving Day Parade
 Raleigh: Raleigh Christmas Parade
 Greensboro: Greensboro Jaycees Christmas Parade
 Chapel Hill: Chapel Hill Arts Parade

North Dakota
 Fargo-Moorhead: "Xcel Energy Holiday Lights Parade"

Ohio
 Cambridge: "A Dickens of a Christmas" Holiday Parade
 Carroll, Ohio: "Carroll Old Timers Festival Aug 21–23 Parade on Aug. 23"
 Fairborn: Christmas Parade
 Gahanna: Lighted Nighttime Parade
 Granville: Christmas Parade
 Greenville: Hometown Holiday Parade
 Lancaster: Old-Fashioned Christmas Parade
 Lebanon: Horse-drawn Carriage Parade
 Marion: Christmas Parade
 Shandon: Christmas in the Country Parade
 Steubenville: Downtown Christmas Parade
 Toledo: Downtown Holiday Parade
 Waverly: Jingle Bell Parade Weekend

Oklahoma
Ada: Christmas Parade
Tulsa: Tulsa Christmas Parade. Held annually since 1926.
Waurika: Christmas Parade (Second weekend in December)

Oregon
 Bend: Bend Christmas Parade
 Pendleton: Pendleton Christmas Carriage Parade
 Portland: Macy's Holiday Parade
 Portland: Christmas Ship Parade

Pennsylvania
 Bradford: Cruisin' into Christmas Parade
 North Wales: Santa Arrival Parade at Montgomery Mall
 Philadelphia: 6abc Dunkin' Donuts Thanksgiving Day Parade 
 Philadelphia: Mummers Parade on New Year's Day
 Pittsburgh: Celebrate the Season Parade
 Scranton: Greater Scranton Jaycees Santa Parade
 State College:  Penn State Homecoming Parade
 West Chester: QVC West Chester Christmas Parade

South Carolina
 Boykin, Kershaw County, South Carolina: Boykin Christmas Parade (Sunday before Christmas)
 Camden, South Carolina: Kershaw County Christmas Parade (Second Saturday in December)
 Columbia, South Carolina: (First week in December)
 Elgin, South Carolina: Elgin Catfish Stomp (First Saturday in December)
 Lugoff, South Carolina: (Week after Elgin Catfish Stomp)
 Rock Hill, South Carolina: (First week in December)

South Dakota

 Rapid City, South Dakota: Christmas Light Parade (Two Saturday's after Thanksgiving)

Tennessee

 Nashville: Annual Donelson-Hermitage Chamber of Commerce Christmas Parade 
 Nashville: Annual Nashville Gas Christmas Parade
 Parrottsville: Annual Parrottsville Christmas Parade

Texas
 Dallas: Comerica Bank New Year's Parade
 Dallas: Children's Health Holiday Parade
 El Paso: First Light Federal Credit Union Sun Bowl Parade. Note: Contrary to the Sun Bowl often being played on New Year's Eve, the associated parade is actually held on Thanksgiving.
 Houston: H-E-B Thanksgiving Day Parade
 Nacogdoches: Nine Flags Christmas Parade
 San Antonio: Ford Holiday River Parade

Virginia
 Chesapeake: Christmas Tree Lighting and Parade
 Leesburg: Annual Christmas and Holiday Parade
 Norfolk: Grand Illumination Parade
 Purcellville: Christmas Parade
 Richmond: Dominion Christmas Parade
 Virginia Beach: Light Up the Town

Washington
 Seattle: Macy's Parade (not to be confused with the Macy's Thanksgiving Day Parade in New York)
Centralia Lighted Tractor Parade located in Lewis County, Washington

West Virginia
 Wheeling: Perkins Restaurant & Bakery Fantasy in Lights Parade

Wisconsin
 Appleton: The Annual Downtown Appleton Christmas Parade
 Berlin: Holiday Parade
 Jefferson: Parade of Lights 
 Menomonie: WinterDaze Holiday Parade
 Mukwonago: Midnight Magic
 Omro: Holiday Parade & Celebration
 Sauk City: Holiday Light Parade
 Sheboygan Falls: Main Street Memories and Holiday Parade

Wyoming

 Alta-Grand Targhee Resort: Grand Targhee Resort Torchlight Parade
 Big Piney: Big Piney Holiday Parade (Article)
 Buffalo: Buffalo Lighted Christmas Parade and Chili Feed
 Casper: Downtown Christmas Parade
 Cheyenne: Cheyenne Christmas Parade
 Cody: Cody Christmas Stroll and Lighted Parade
 Gillette: Gillette Parade of Lights 
 Jackson-Snow King Mountain Resort: Snow King Mountain Resort Torchlight Parade
 La Barge: La Barge Christmas Parade (Article)
 Lander: Light Up Lander Christmas Parade
 Laramie: Holiday Tree Lighting & Parade
 Pinedale: Annual Mountain Man Christmas Parade
 Pinedale-White Pine Ski Resort: White Pine Ski Resort Torchlight Parade
 Powell: Powell Lighted Christmas Parade
 Rawlins: Rawlins Winterfest Weekend Starlight Christmas Parade
 Rock Springs: Annual Lighted Holiday Parade
 Saratoga: Christmas Parade and Winter Wonderland
 Sundance: Sundance Lighted Parade
 Teton Village-Jackson Hole Mountain Resort: Jackson Hole Mountain Resort New Year's Eve Torchlight Parade & Fireworks
 Worland: Worland Christmas Parade

South America

Chile 

 Santiago: Paris Parade

Colombia
 Medellín: :es:Desfile de Mitos y Leyendas (Parade of Myths and Legends). Held annually on 7 December since 1974.

See also
 Santa Claus parade
 List of objects dropped on New Year's Eve

References

Parades
Christmas